Grič pri Klevevžu is a settlement in the Municipality of Šmarješke Toplice in southeastern Slovenia. The area is part of the historical region of Lower Carniola. The municipality is now included in the Southeast Slovenia Statistical Region.

Name

The name Grič pri Klevevžu literally means 'hillock near Klevevž'. The name refers to medieval Klevevž Castle, first mentioned in written documents dating to 1267. The surrounding Lower Carniolan lands in the Radulja valley had been acquired the Bavarian Prince-Bishops of Freising from the estates of the late Saint Hemma of Gurk. The bishops finally sold their remote lordship in 1622. The castle was burned down by the Partisans during World War II.

Mass graves
Grič pri Klevevžu is the site of three known mass graves associated with the Second World War. The Klevevž 1–3 mass graves are located north of the settlement. They are also known as the Kačja Rid, Bričevka, or Jurjevci mass graves. They contain the remains of Slovene and Romani civilians murdered by the Partisans in the spring and early summer of 1942 while the staff of the Krka Detachment was at Klevevž Castle.

Landmarks
Klevevž is known for the ruins of Klevevž Castle with the remains of the castle park, the hypothermal spring Klevevž Spa, also suitable for bathing, and two caves, Upper Klevevž Cave and Lower Klevevž (or Heathen) Cave ( or ). The first one is an over -long dry cave, with some dripstones at its end. Some prehistoric ceramics has been found there. The latter is a water cave inside of which there is the only known thermal spring in a cave in Slovenia. It is a home to a rich animal life, including bat colonies. The hypothermal spring flows to the Radulja, which flows through a gorge formed in the Triassic limestone and forms a cascade in this part.

References

External links
Grič pri Klevevžu at Geopedia

Populated places in the Municipality of Šmarješke Toplice